The list of shipwrecks in 1993 includes all ships sunk, foundered, grounded, or otherwise lost during 1993.

January

5 January

14 January

16 January

21 January

February

7 February

18 February

28 February

March

8 March

14 March

April

9 April

12 April

16 April

May

13 May

June

3 June

5 June

10 June

11 June

12 June

24 June

July

1 July

2 July

19 July

22 July

27 July

August

1 August

3 August

5 August

7 August

8 August

9 August

16 August

30 August

Unknown

September

7 September

9 September

11 September

17 September

18 September

23 September

October

10 October

20 October

November

18 November

December

9 December

Unknown date

References

1993
 
Ship